Chris Stead (born 6 April 1979) is an Australian video games journalist, editor and publisher. He is best known for founding the Australian editions of Game Informer and GamePro magazines and their websites. In 2013 he won the inaugural MCV Pacific Journalist of the Year award. In 2014, he launched Grab It Indie Games Magazine. In 2015 he launched the print and digital book publishing company Old Mate Media.

Early life
Stead was born in Sydney, Australia and is the oldest of five children. He studied Molecular Biology and Genetics at Sydney University, graduating in 2000.

Career

Early career
Stead's first published work appeared in N64 Gamer magazine in 1997. During this time he also contributed to Hyper, PC PowerPlay and GameSpot, amongst others. In 2000, he signed with ACP Magazines as Staff Writer for the launch of Official PlayStation Magazine.

GamePro
In 2003 Stead signed on with IDG to launch the Australian edition of GamePro magazine as senior staff writer, with veteran editor Stuart Clarke. Stead later become deputy editor, and then editor prior to his departure in 2007.

Gameplayer
Soon after departing IDG, Stead signed on with Derwent Howard to launch a new gaming website called Gameplayer as editor-in-chief. After two years, he left the site to contribute to IGN, Official PlayStation Magazine and the Australian version of Official Xbox Magazine.

Game Informer
In 2009, Chris Stead re-signed with Derwent Howard to launch an Australian edition of Game Informer magazine. The magazine picked up the 2011 and 2012 Australian Magazine Award for the Computing & Games category, and the 2013 MCV Pacific Award for Print Publication of the Year. In January 2014, Stead left after completing the 51st issue.

Grab It Indie Games Magazine
In February 2014, Stead released the first issue of Grab It Indie Games Magazine. In October of 2014, Grab It was a finalist in the Digital Magazine Awards 2014, ultimately receiving a highly commended accolade. Eight episodes of the magazine were released, as well as standalone episode based around the game Nihilumbra. The eighth and final episode of Grab It Magazine is notable for also doubling as the indie guide to PAX AUS 2014.

Old Mate Media
In January 2015, Stead began publishing fiction and non-fiction print and digital books under his company name, Old Mate Media. As well as publishing books authored by Stead, the Old Mate Media label provides editing, design and publishing services to independent authors.

Finder
Since February 2015, Stead has been active as an editor for Australian comparison site Finder. In 2016, Stead was nominated for Best Gaming Journalist at The Lizzies.

Books written by Chris Stead
The books written by Chris Stead have been published through Amazon and many other online stores.

 The Little Green Boat (Book 1 The Wild Imagination of Willy Nilly Series) -2015
 Follow the Breadcrumbs (Book 2 The Wild Imagination of Willy Nilly Series) - 2016
 My Birthday Cake Needs a New Home - 2016
 Fastest Kid in the World (Book 3 The Wild Imagination of Willy Nilly Series) - 2016
 A Very Strange Zoo - 2016
 Can You See the Magic - 2016
 Nintendo Switch - The Complete Insider's Guide - 2017
 Adam Exitus (Book 1 Adam X series) - 2017 (written with Nick Adbilla)
 The Making of Monument Valley - 2017
 What is Cryptocurrency: Your Complete Guide to Bitcoin, Blockchain and Beyond - 2018
 Christmas Chimney Challenge (Book 4 The Wild Imagination of Willy Nilly Series) - 2018
 Let the Sad Thoughts Out - 2020
 Ultimate at Home Activities Guide for Kids - 2020
 Adam Exiled (Book 2 Adam X series) - 2020 (written with Nick Adbilla)
 Nintendo Switch Gaming Guide - 2020
 Gentle George - 2020 (written with Ken MacKenzie)
 Sony PS5 Gaming Guide - 2020
 Adam Nexus (Book 3 Adam X series) - 2020 (written with Nick Adbilla)

References

1979 births
Living people
Journalists from Sydney
Video game critics